The Independent Liberal Party (Samostalna liberalna stranka, SLS) is a Kosovan political party.

In the 2010 Kosovan parliamentary election, the party won 2.1% of the popular vote and 8 out of 120 seats. In February 2011, the SLS joined the coalition government of Hashim Thaçi, whose Democratic Party of Kosovo won the largest share of votes in the elections. The SLS got three ministries – Local Self-Government, Communities and Return, and Labor and Social Welfare.

In the 2014 Kosovan parliamentary election, the party won only 0.05% of the popular vote and lost all of its seats.

Ideology

The party recognizes Kosovo's independence from Serbia. Its overall stance is liberal.

References

External links
Official website

2006 establishments in Kosovo
Liberal International
Liberal parties in Kosovo
Political parties established in 2006
Serb political parties in Kosovo